Orso Mario Corbino (30 April 1876, Augusta – 23 January 1937, Rome) was an Italian physicist and politician. His younger brother was Epicarmo Corbino.

He served as the minister for education in 1921 and as the minister for economy in 1921.  He also served as professor in Messina (1905) and in Rome (1908). He is noted for his studies of the influence of external magnetic fields on the motion of electrons in metals and he discovered the Corbino effect.  Corbino worked with Damiano Macaluso where they discovered the Macaluso-Corbino effect, a strong magneto-rotation of the plane of polarization observed at wavelengths close to an absorption line of the material through which the light is travelling. As director of the Institute of physics he was the supervisor of Enrico Fermi, Edoardo Amaldi, Franco Rasetti, Emilio Segrè, Bruno Pontecorvo, Oscar D'Agostino, Ettore Majorana, and Elena Freda.

Works

See also
 Via Panisperna boys

References

External links

 
 

20th-century Italian physicists
1876 births
1937 deaths
Mussolini Cabinet
Members of the Senate of the Kingdom of Italy
Scientists from Sicily